Doing Time, Doing Vipassana is a 1997 Israeli independent documentary film project by two women filmmakers from Israel: Ayelet Menahemi and Eilona Ariel. The film is about the application of the vipassana meditation technique taught by S. N. Goenka to prisoner rehabilitation at Tihar Jail in India (which was reputed to be an exceptionally harsh prison). The film inspired other correctional facilities such as the North Rehabilitation Facility in Seattle to use Vipassana as a means of rehabilitation.

Kiran Bedi, former Inspector General of Prisons for New Delhi, appears in the film.

Reception
Doing Time, Doing Vipassana received an average score of 64 based on eight critics at Metacritic. It received a 71% rating based on 14 reviews at Rotten Tomatoes.

The San Francisco Chronicle wrote of the film winning the Golden Spire Award at the San Francisco International Film Festival when noting its 2005 theatrical release. They praised the film, writing it had "distinct virtues: It tells a fascinating story. It makes a strong case for an alternative approach to incarcerated criminals. And it provides an attractive introduction to Vipassana meditation."

Slant Magazine gave the film two out of five stars, and generally panned the film, stating that the directors "fail to really get inside the heads of their subjects and to seriously convey the extent to which violence plays a role in their daily lives, choosing instead to follow the process with which Vipassana comes to the prison community and holds its prisoners in rapture."  They felt the film's repeated use of "hyperbolic narration....strains to summon a sense of spiritual gravitas" and that the filmmakers brevity and informational tone made the film "something akin to an Epcot Center attraction."

Awards and nominations
 1998, winner of 'Golden Spire Award'  at the San Francisco International Film Festival
 1998, winner of NCCD Pass Award from the American National Council on Crime and Delinquency
 2000, winner of 'Gold Illumination Award' at Crested Butte Film Festival
 2000, winner of 'Silver Award' for best documentary at Crested Butte Reel Fest

See also
 Satipatthana Sutta
 Vipassanā
 Vipassana Movement
 The Dhamma Brothers (2007)

References

External links
 
 

Israeli documentary films
1997 films
Documentary films about psychology
Films shot in Delhi
Documentary films about the penal system
Documentary films about India
Penal system in India
Prison religion
1997 documentary films
1990s English-language films